Y Bham Enuol (Y Bhăm Êñuôl; Y Bham for short; 1913–20 April 1975) was a Rhade civil servant and a prominent figure during the Vietnam War.

Y Bham Enuol was born in Buôn Ma Thuột, Đắk Lắk Province in 1913. On May 1, 1958, he established BAJARAKA, an organization seeking autonomy for minorities in the Central Highlands. BAJARAKA was the predecessor of the United Front for the Liberation of Oppressed Races (FULRO), which played an important role during the Vietnam War. Y Bham was selected president of FULRO.

On 20 September 1964, Y Bham was arrested and deported to Cambodia. Later, he lived in Phnom Penh. When the Communist Party of Kampuchea (Khmer Rouge) seized Phnom Penh on 17 April 1975, Y Bham and other FULRO leaders living in Phnom Penh sought refuge in the French Embassy. On 20 April they were all taken out and executed. However, members of FULRO did not know of his death until, after seventeen years American journalist Nate Thayer informed the group that Y Bham had been executed.

References

1913 births
1975 deaths
People from Đắk Lắk Province
Rade people
People of the Vietnam War
People executed by the Khmer Rouge